The Segusini (Gaulish: *Segusinoi, 'those of Segusio') were a Gallic tribe dwelling around present-day Susa, in the Alpes Cottiae, during the Iron Age.

Name
They are mentioned as Segosianō̃n (Σεγοσιανῶν) Strabo (early 1st c. AD), as Segousianō̃n (Σεγουσιανῶν) Ptolemy (2nd c. AD), as Segusinorum on the Arch of Susa, and as Segusinae on an inscription. 

The ethnonym Segusini is a latinized form of Gaulish *Segusinoi. It means 'the people of Segusio', itself from the root sego- ('victory, force').

Geography  

The Segusini dwelled in the valley of the Duria, around Segusio (modern Susa). Their territory was located east of the Medulli and Belaci, south of the Acitavones, and east of the Iemerii and Taurini. 

Their chief town, Segusio, controlled the route over Mont Genèvre and served as the gateway into the Italian Peninsula. Segusio possessed Latin law probably from the time of Augustus (27 BC–14 AD) and was a municipium from the time of Nero (54–58 AD). It was conquered by Constantinus in 312 AD.

History 
They are attested on the Arch of Susa, erected by Cottius in 9–8 BC.

References

Primary sources

Bibliography 

Historical Celtic peoples
Gauls
Ancient peoples of Italy
History of Piedmont